Walter Stanley Szot (March 30, 1920 – November 3, 1981) was an American football tackle who played five seasons in the National Football League with the Chicago Cardinals and Pittsburgh Steelers. He was drafted by the Chicago Cardinals in the 18th round of the 1944 NFL Draft. He played prep football at East Rutherford High School in his hometown of East Rutherford, New Jersey and played college football for the Bucknell Bison.

College career
Szot was a three-year starter for the Bucknell Bison. He was co-captain of the 1943 Bison team. He earned first-team all-state honors in 1943 while also garnering All-East and All-America recognition. Szot also earned second-team All-Pennsylvania honors in 1942. He was on the boxing team for one year and was president of the "B" Club his senior year. He was inducted into the Bucknell Hall of Fame in 1993.

Professional career

Chicago Cardinals
Szot was selected by the Chicago Cardinals with the 176th pick in the 1944 NFL Draft. He played in 33 games, starting one, for the Cardinals from 1946 to 1948.

Pittsburgh Steelers
Szot played in 23, starting two, for the Pittsburgh Steelers from 1949 to 1950.

Personal life
Szot served in the United States Marine Corps for three years during World War II prior to joining the Chicago Cardinals. In 1951, Szot, a Marine reservist, was recalled to active duty during the Korean War.

References

External links
Just Sports Stats

1920 births
1981 deaths
American football tackles
Bucknell Bison football players
Chicago Cardinals players
East Rutherford High School alumni
Pittsburgh Steelers players
United States Marine Corps personnel of World War II
United States Marine Corps personnel of the Korean War
United States Marine Corps reservists

People from East Rutherford, New Jersey
Players of American football from New Jersey
Sportspeople from Bergen County, New Jersey
Sportspeople from Clifton, New Jersey